Adriano B. Lucatelli (born 23 February 1966) is a Swiss entrepreneur in the financial services industry.

Life 
Adriano Lucatelli was born on 23 February 1966 in Uster near Zurich, Switzerland. His father’s family originated from Apulia in southern Italy, and worked primarily in agriculture and the textile industry. His mother’s family comes from central Switzerland. His great-grandfather was the entrepreneur and pioneer in electricity Zeno Durrer, and his great uncle was Ludwig von Moos, a member of the Swiss federal government (the Swiss Federal Council).

Education and career 
Lucatelli studied international affairs and economics at the University of Nevada, Reno (BA) and at the London School of Economics (MSc) and obtained his PhD from the University of Zurich with a dissertation on global financial market regulation. Parallel to his career he has also completed an MBA program at the University of Rochester (N.Y.), an advanced management program at the Wharton School and an executive program at the Singularity University in Silicon Valley.

Since 2009, Lucatelli has been an entrepreneur in the financial services industry. He started his career in 1994 at Credit Suisse, where he held various managerial positions in Zurich and London. From 2002 to 2009 Lucatelli was managing director and member of the management committee at UBS Switzerland in Lugano and Zurich. 

From 2012 to 2018, he lectured at the University of Zurich on the political economy of international finance.

Publications and commentaries 
In the course of his career Lucatelli has published various articles in newspapers, journals and online magazines and has authored the books Finance and World Order (1997), Off-Target Corporate Governance (2013), and The Fine Art of Efficient Investing (2015). In 2018, he co-authored with Lucienne C. Vaudan “Eine kurze Reise durch die Finanzmärkte.” He was a regular guest at the business TV channel CNN Money Switzerland.

Investment expertise 
Lucatelli's main research interest lies in determining the main factors influencing the increase in company value. In this context, Lucatelli, together with Ernst Fehr, calculated the Market-Adjusted Performance Indicator (MAPI) for listed Swiss companies for the first time and showed that good management systematically generates shareholder value, as evidenced by the fact that the shares of these companies have in some cases achieved significantly better results than the market average as measured by the broad-based Swiss Performance Index (SPI).

Awards and recognition 
In 2011, he earned the Distinguished Alumni Award from the College of Liberal Arts at the University of Nevada. 

From 2017 to 2022, the Swiss business magazine "Bilanz" chose him among the top 100 Swiss bankers.

Extraprofessional activities 
Lucatelli is an honorary member of Pi Sigma Alpha (the National Political Science Honor Society) and a member of the Athenaeum Club in London.

In 1993, Lucatelli spent six months at the General Secretariat of Amnesty International in Switzerland.

He is also an enthusiastic aviator and flies helicopters himself.

Quotes 
"If finance can't improve the lives of people, we have no use for it."

"Visions also have to be solidly financed."

"What is wrong economically can't be right politically."

References 

Swiss businesspeople
Living people
1966 births
University of Nevada, Reno alumni
University of Zurich alumni
University of Rochester alumni
Alumni of the London School of Economics
People from Uster